Andrej Gaćina (born 21 May 1986) is a male table tennis player from Croatia. Since 2007, he has won two medals in doubles and team events in the Table Tennis European Championships.

 As of August 2016, he was the number nineteenth player in the world. On club level he competes for Olympiacos, with whom he won the ETTU Europe Trophy in 2023. In 2021 he played for Apuania Carrara Tennistavolo and in 2022 he won Europe Cup, Supercoppa italiana and Coppa Italia.

See also
 List of table tennis players

References

External links
 
 
 
 
 

1986 births
Living people
Sportspeople from Zadar
Croatian male table tennis players
Olympic table tennis players of Croatia
Olympiacos Table Tennis players
Panathinaikos table tennis players
Table tennis players at the 2008 Summer Olympics
Table tennis players at the 2012 Summer Olympics
Table tennis players at the 2016 Summer Olympics
Table tennis players at the 2015 European Games
European Games competitors for Croatia
Mediterranean Games silver medalists for Croatia
Competitors at the 2009 Mediterranean Games
Mediterranean Games medalists in table tennis
Table tennis players at the 2019 European Games
Table tennis players at the 2020 Summer Olympics
21st-century Croatian people